Melanchra assimilis, commonly known as the black arches or similar black noctuid, is a species of cutworm or dart moth in the family Noctuidae. It is found in North America.

The MONA or Hodges number for Melanchra assimilis is 10295.

References

Further reading

 
 
 

Melanchra
Articles created by Qbugbot
Moths described in 1874